Güneyyurt is a belde (town) in Karaman Province, Turkey

Geography 

It is a part of Ermenek district which in turn is a part of Karaman Province.

History 

The former name of Güneyyurt was Gargara. In an ancient shrine carved in rocks there are sculptures of lions, bulls and a snake  After Seleucid and Isaurian dominations, in the first century BC, the town became a part of the Roman Empire. During the early years of Christianity, Gargara was one of the towns Barnabas visited before leaving for Cyprus. There are ruins of chapels in caves around Güneyyurt. The town then became a part of the Byzantine Empire. After a brief Turkish domination in the late 11th century the town was captured by the Crusades and for more than a century became a part of the Armenian Kingdom of Cilicia. In the early 13th century, Seljuk Turks annexed the town. After Seljuks were defeated by the Ilkhanid Mongols, the town fell under the Karamanids, a powerful Turkish tribe. In the early 15th century the town was incorporated into the Ottoman Empire.

Economy 
Although the climate is convenient for fruit agriculture, because of the rocky landscape, agricultural income is limited. Goats are the preferred in animal husbandry

Future

According to Sustainable development report prepared by the Ministry of Environment and Forestry (Turkey) the projected population of Güneyyurt in 2025 is 10000. The present master plan  of the town is found to be sufficient for the future expansion.

References 

Populated places in Karaman Province
Towns in Turkey
Ermenek District